Clarence Fulton Secondary is a public high school in Vernon, British Columbia part of School District 22 Vernon. It is named after Clarence Fulton, former principal of several Vernon schools. Previously there was another high school named Fulton Secondary located beside Polson Park before being replaced by the current school in 1993 located in the Okanagan Landing area.

Notable alumni
James Green, CFL player

References

High schools in British Columbia
Schools in the Okanagan
High schools in Vernon, British Columbia
Educational institutions established in 1964
1964 establishments in British Columbia